Adisvaraswamy Jain Temple is a Jain temple dedicated to the deity Jain, located at Karanthattankudi in Thanjavur in Thanjavur District, Tamil Nadu, India

Other Jain Temples
This temple is situated at Karanthattankudi (also known as Karunthittaikkudi) near Thanjavur. There are also Jain temples in Kumbakonam, Mannargudi, Deepankudi and other places in Tamil Nadu.

Structure of the temple
The temple has sanctum sanctorum, Rajagopura, artha mandapa, front mandapa and maha mandapa. In front of the mandapa flagpost is found. Temple functions are held in front mandapa. On either side of the front mandapa, guardian deities are found on either side. In the four pillars of mahamandapa. Tirttankara sculptures are found. The vimana has two tiers. The shrine of mahasastha is found in the temple. This temple is said to be of 600 years old and the front mandapa, Jinavani shrine, Sasana deva shrine are of 300 years old. This is the only temple in Tamil Nadu having a separate shrine for Jinavani, with the structures of temple, such as sanctum sanctorum, arthamandapa, front mandapa and Prakaram. Kunthunatha sculpture is found here. There are shrines for Brahmadeva, Jwalamalini, Dharmadevi, Padmavati and Navagraha. There is a puja mandapam with 16 pillars. The temple also has a nandavana and temple tank.

Presiding deity
The presiding deity is known as Adisvaraswamy and as Adhinathar. He is also known as Rishabhanatha, the First Tirttankara.

Festivals
Festivals are held regularly. During Akshaya Tritiya, the deity goes around the temple. During the first Sundays of Tamil month of Adi Sasanadevi are going around the temple. During Navaratri, on seventh day, float festival is held.

See also
Arihant (Jainism)
God in Jainism
Jainism and non-creationism
Tijara Jain Temple
Jainism in Tamil Nadu
Tamil Jain

References

External links 

 Harvard Pluralism Project: Jainism

Jain temples in Tamil Nadu